The 2022 Supercopa Paraguay was the second edition of the Supercopa Paraguay, Paraguay's football super cup. It was held on 25 January 2023 between the 2022 Primera División best-ranked champions in the aggregate table Olimpia and the 2022 Copa Paraguay champions Sportivo Ameliano at Estadio Defensores del Chaco in Asunción. Unlike the previous edition, this match was the opening event of the 2023 season.

Sportivo Ameliano won the match, defeating Olimpia 1–0 to claim their first Supercopa Paraguay title.

Teams
The Supercopa Paraguay is contested by two teams: the champions of the Copa Paraguay and the Primera División (Apertura or Clausura) champions with the best record in the aggregate table of the season.

Details

References

External links
 Supercopa Paraguay on the Paraguayan Football Association's website

S
S